Wini Shaw (c. 1907 – May 2, 1982), sometimes credited as Winifred Shaw, was a 20th century American actress, dancer and singer.

Early life
She was born as Winifred Lei Momi in about 1907, in San Francisco, California, the youngest of thirteen children of Hawaiian descent.

Some sources suggest she was born in 1910, while the Social Security Death Index under her married name Wini O'Malley suggests she was born in 1907.

Career
Shaw began her entertainment career as a child in her parents' vaudeville act and later appeared in a number of Warner Brothers musical films in the 1930s. She is best remembered for introducing the song "Lullaby of Broadway" in the musical film Gold Diggers of 1935 (1935).

Shaw's only recording, (Decca 408) with Dick Jurgens and his Orchestra, was "Lullaby of Broadway" and "I'm Goin' Shoppin' with You".  Both songs were from the film, and the recording was made on February 28, 1935.

She also sang "The Lady in Red" in the musical film In Caliente (1935) starring Dolores del Río; the song was later made famous when cartoon character Bugs Bunny (voiced by Mel Blanc) parodied it in drag.

In 1937 she filmed a complicated duet live on the sound stage with a reciting and speaking Ross Alexander as she sang "Too Marvelous for Words" for the finale of Ready, Willing, and Able.

Shaw appeared in a brief revival of the musical-theatre production of Simple Simon (1931) on Broadway in New York City.

During World War II she toured service camps and Red Cross clubs for the USO, sometimes as part of the Jack Benny or Larry Adler troupes.

Filmography

Cross Country Cruise (1934), uncredited
Gift of Gab (1934)
What, No Men! (1934) short film
I Believed in You (1934), uncredited
Million Dollar Ransom (1934)
Sweet Adeline (1934)
Three on a Honeymoon (1934)
Wake Up and Dream (1934)
Wild Gold (1934)
Broadway Hostess (1935)
The Case of the Curious Bride (1935)
Front Page Woman (1935)
Gold Diggers of 1935 (1935)
Gypsy Sweetheart (1935)
In Caliente (1935)
Page Miss Glory (1935), uncredited
The Case of the Velvet Claws (1936)
Fugitive in the Sky (1936)
King of the Islands (1936)
Romance in the Air (1936)
Satan Met a Lady (1936)
The Singing Kid (1936)
Sons o' Guns (1936)
Melody for Two (1937)
Ready, Willing, and Able (1937)
September in the Rain (1937), voice
Smart Blonde (1937)
Little Me (1938)
Rhumba Land (1939)

Death
She died at the age of 75 in New York City and is buried at Calvary Cemetery, Queens, a cemetery designated for people who were of the Catholic faith.

References

External links

20th-century births
1982 deaths
American female dancers
American film actresses
American Roman Catholics
Burials at Calvary Cemetery (Queens)
Actresses from San Francisco
Singers from San Francisco
Vaudeville performers
20th-century American actresses
20th-century American singers
American people of Native Hawaiian descent
Native Hawaiian actresses
20th-century American women singers
20th-century American dancers